Margaret of Saxony may refer to:

 Margaret of Saxony (d. 1429), wife of Bernard I, Duke of Brunswick-Lüneburg
 Margaret of Austria, Electress of Saxony (1416–1486), wife of Frederick II, Elector of Saxony
 Margaret of Saxony (1444–1498), daughter of Frederick II, Elector of Saxony and became the Abbess of Seusslitz
 Margaret of Thuringia (Margaret of Saxony; 1449–1501), daughter of William III, Landgrave of Thuringia and wife of John Cicero, Elector of Brandenburg
 Margaret of Saxony, Duchess of Brunswick-Lüneburg (1469–1528), daughter of Ernest, Elector of Saxony and wife of Henry I of Lüneburg
 Princess Margaretha of Saxony (1840–1858), daughter of John of Saxony and wife of Archduke Karl Ludwig of Austria
 Princess Margarete Karola of Saxony (1900–1962), daughter of Frederick Augustus III of Saxony and wife of Frederick, Prince of Hohenzollern